Asesewa is a small town and the district capital of Upper Manya Krobo district in the Eastern region of southern Ghana. Asesewa is a historic trading post. It has a mix of cultures who are from all over Ghana. It is located about 45 km from the regional capital of Eastern region,  Koforidua.

Education

The small town Asesewa is known for the Asesewa Day Secondary School now Asesewa Senior High School and the Asesewa Government Hospital, the only hospital that serves the district.  The school is a second cycle institution.

References

Populated places in the Eastern Region (Ghana)